Nossa is a genus of moths in the family Epicopeiidae. The genus was described by William Forsell Kirby in 1892.

Species
Nossa alpherakii (Herz, 1904)
Nossa moorei (Elwes, 1890)
Nossa nagaensis (Elwes, 1890)
Nossa nelcinna (Moore, [1875])
Nossa palaearctica (Staudinger, 1887)

Former species
 Nossa chinensis
 Nossa leechii

References

External links

Epicopeiidae
Moth genera